Hakodate Arena is an arena in Hakodate, Hokkaido, Japan.

References

Basketball venues in Japan
Indoor arenas in Japan
Levanga Hokkaido
Sports venues in Hokkaido
Buildings and structures in Hakodate
Sports venues completed in 2015
2015 establishments in Japan